Jaime Camara (born November 5, 1980 in Goiânia) is a Brazilian race car driver, who in 2008 competed in the IndyCar Series for Conquest Racing.

Motorsports career

Indy Racing League
Camara previously competed in the 2005 and 2006 seasons of the Indy Racing League's Indy Pro Series and finished 5th and 6th in series points, respectively. He has also won the 2005 Freedom 100, the Indy Pro Series' biggest race, from the pole.

He sought a ride in the Indy Racing League IndyCar Series during the 2006-2007 offseason, but could not put a deal together and returned to the IPS and Andretti Green Racing for the 2007 season. He finished 6th in points for the second year in a row without scoring a win.

On April 24, 2008 he was announced as the driver of the #34 Conquest Racing entry in the IndyCar Series beginning with the RoadRunner Turbo Indy 300 at Kansas Speedway and will remain through the balance of the season. At the Indianapolis 500 he pulled into the wrong pit box, delaying teammate Enrique Bernoldi in the process; he later crashed out in a single-car incident. After a very strong run at Richmond International Raceway, where he moved from a starting position of 24th up to first where he led 44 laps, he crashed out in another single-car incident. He finished the season 23rd in points. He participated in a test with the Conquest team prior to the 2009 season, but Alex Tagliani was named the driver for the team's single car prior to the beginning of the season.

Motorsports career results

American Open-Wheel racing results
(key) (Races in bold indicate pole position)

Indy Lights

IndyCar

 1 Races held on same day.
 2 Non-points-paying exhibition race.

Indianapolis 500

Complete GT1 World Championship results

References

External links

1980 births
Brazilian racing drivers
Indianapolis 500 drivers
Indy Lights drivers
IndyCar Series drivers
Living people
Sportspeople from Goiânia
Formula 3 Sudamericana drivers
FIA GT1 World Championship drivers
Brazilian IndyCar Series drivers
Arrow McLaren SP drivers
Andretti Autosport drivers
AFS Racing drivers
Conquest Racing drivers